Sericitic alteration or sericitization is a process of mineral alteration caused by hydrothermal fluids invading permeable country rock. Plagioclase feldspar within the rock is converted to sericite (sericite is not a mineral; it is a term that is used to describe any fine-grained white phyllosilicate when a distinction cannot be determined), which typically consists of fine-grained white mica and related minerals. Sericitic alteration occurs within the phyllic alteration zone.

Geochemical processes
Phyllosilicates